Zaurbek Sokhiev (born June 1, 1986 in Tajik SSR, Soviet Union) is a Russian-Ossetian male freestyle wrestler, who represented Uzbekistan, a freestyle wrestling world champion (2009), a participant in the Summer Olympic Games in Beijing (2008) and London (2012). Master of sports of international class in freestyle wrestling.

External links
 

Living people
1986 births
Uzbekistani male sport wrestlers
Olympic wrestlers of Uzbekistan
Wrestlers at the 2008 Summer Olympics
Wrestlers at the 2012 Summer Olympics
Asian Games medalists in wrestling
Wrestlers at the 2006 Asian Games
World Wrestling Championships medalists
Asian Games silver medalists for Uzbekistan
Medalists at the 2006 Asian Games
Uzbekistani people of Ossetian descent
Tajikistani people of Ossetian descent
Asian Wrestling Championships medalists